Jašić is a Bosniak surname.

People with the surname
Adis Jasic (born 2003), Austrian footballer of Bosnian descent
Vladimir Jašić (born 1984), a Serbian football player

Bosnian surnames